Rose Creative Strategies, a subsidiary of Rose Marketing Ltd. is an advertising and public relations agency founded in the USSR. The agency originally functioned as a branch of the American agency and offered communication and advertising services to international companies entering the Soviet market.

Today, the company provides integrated services with a focus on strategy, public relations and digital marketing, including Social Media, communications to the brands like Filippo Berio, Lavazza, Lexus, Logitech and Neffos is managing the brands' official social media accounts (Logitech, Neffos (TP-Link), Lavazza, etc.). The company represents popular brands like Coca-Cola, Citibank, Officine Panerai, PepsiCo, Pfizer,  Volvo, GlaxoSmithKline, and others.

History
The agency was created in the US in 1984. The Russian office was opened in 1989 and started offering advertising services to the international companies entering the Soviet market, in particular for Coca-Cola and Fanta, which were among the first advertising campaigns in Russia created by founder John Rose and his Russian team. In 1991, the agency placed the first advertising billboard for Coca-Cola near the Paveletsky railway station. The agency also launched the first in Russia scratch cards promotion with instant prizes for the Sony and created the first Russian outdoor advertising campaigns for Baskin Robbins.

In 1995 the agency launched an advertising campaign for "Stresstabs" which included an award-winning billboard featuring a business man (actually a mannequin) that was about to make his last jump. The billboard said: "Stop. Take Stresstabs". The single billboard resulted in massive publicity and became the finalist of London International Advertising Awards — London International Advertising Awards.

In 2015 the agency was included in the international rating of the leading communication agencies of the world according to The Holmes Report and the International association of PR consultants. In 2015 the agency opened its office  in Havana, Cuba.

Today, Rose is a diverse communications group providing integrated marketing services.

Management
The head of the company is its founder John Rose, a highly regarded business strategist, an award-winning writer, producer and creative director and Public Relations specialist.[6] John Rose has advised some of the world's best-known brands, including Coca-Cola, DuPont, GlaxoSmithKline, Marriott, Samsung, Sony, Volvo. 
  
John was among the first Americans to recognize business opportunities in the former USSR and launched an office for his Boston-based company in Moscow in 1989 as Russia's first independent advertising and public relations agency. 
  
John is a founder of the Russia Chapter of the International Advertising Association (IAA).

 Since 1991 Galina Savina is the CEO. Galina Savina held the post of IAA Russia chapter President from 1993 to 1999. Currently, she continues her activity as vice-president.She was several times included into the list of "1000 most professional managers of Russia".

References

External links
Official Website
Amazon Marketing
IR, PR & Marketing

Companies based in Boston
American companies established in 1984
Advertising agencies of the United States
Public relations companies of the United States
Companies established in 1984